Utrivalva usurpata is a species of moth of the family Tortricidae. It is found in Guatemala.

References

Moths described in 1987
Chlidanotini
Moths of Central America
Taxa named by Józef Razowski